Ashrafuddin Abu Muhammad Hasan ibn Muhammad Husayni Ghaznavi known as Ashraf (اشرف) was a 12th-century Persian poet. A sayyid, he boasted of his lineage from the family of the prophet Muhammad in his poetry.

Originating from Ghazna now in Afghanistan, he served mostly under Yamin ud-Dawlah Bahram Shah of the Ghaznavid dynasty. He also served Sultan Sanjar for a while. He died in Azadvar, Iran, where he is buried.

His divan contains 83 ghazals.

He died around 1160 or 1161.

References
 Jan Rypka, History of Iranian Literature. Reidel Publishing Company. ASIN B-000-6BXVT-K

Notes

See also

List of Persian poets and authors
Persian literature
Persian poetry

Hassan Ghaznavi
Persian-language poets
12th-century Persian-language poets
Burials in Iran
Year of birth unknown
Ghaznavid-period poets
12th-century Iranian people